Khaosan Pathet Lao (KPL), also known as the Lao News Agency in English, is the official news agency of the Laos Government and the ruling Communist Party. It was started as the news agency of the Lao People's Revolutionary Party on 6 January 1968 in Viengsay and later became the official news agency of Laos after the communists seized power in 1976. Its current General Director is Sounthone Khanthavong.

References

External links
Khaosan Pathet Lao
BBC Laos Media

Mass media in Laos
News agencies based in Laos